Adam Chambers  is a Canadian politician who was elected to represent the riding of Simcoe North  in the House of Commons of Canada in the 2021 Canadian federal election.

Biography
Chambers attended St. Theresa's High School in Midland, Ontario and has a law degree and an MBA from the University of Western Ontario. He worked as a senior advisor to Jim Flaherty, in the financial industry and runs an online education business. Chambers is married and has two children.

Election results

References

External links

Living people
Year of birth missing (living people)
Members of the House of Commons of Canada from Ontario
Conservative Party of Canada MPs
21st-century Canadian politicians
People from Midland, Ontario
Western Law School alumni
Businesspeople from Ontario